Thomas Gee (24 January 181528 September 1898), was a Welsh Nonconformist preacher, journalist and publisher.

Gee was born in Denbigh, Wales. At the age of fourteen he went into his father's printing office, Gwasg Gee, but continued to attend the grammar school in the afternoons.

In 1837 he went to London to improve his knowledge of printing, and on his return to Wales in the following year, he threw himself into literary, educational and religious work. Among his publications were the well-known quarterly magazine Y Traethodydd ("The Essayist"), Y Gwyddoniadur Cymreig ("Encyclopaedia Cambrensis"), and Dr. Silvan Evans; English-Welsh Dictionary (1868), but his greatest achievement in this field was the newspaper Baner Cymru ("The Banner of Wales"), founded in 1857 and amalgamated with Yr Amserau ("The Times") two years later as Baner ac Amserau Cymru.

This paper soon became regarded as an oracle in Wales, and played a great part in promoting the nationalist and home rule movement in the country. In educational matters he waged a long and successful struggle on behalf of undenominational schools and for the establishment of the intermediate school system. He was an enthusiastic advocate of church disestablishment, and had a historic newspaper duel with John Owen (afterwards Bishop of St David's) on this question. The Eisteddfod found in him a thorough friend and a wise counsellor. His commanding presence, mastery of diction, and resonant voice made him an effective platform speaker. He was ordained to the Calvinistic Methodist ministry, at Bala in 1847, and gave his time and talents ungrudgingly to Sunday school and temperance work. Throughout his life he believed in the itinerant unpaid ministry rather than in the settled pastorate.

In 1886 he founded the Welsh Land League to campaign for the rights of tenants.

Gee attended the founding meeting of the Welsh National Liberal Council in August 1898, and was elected as the organisation's president.  He died in September, and his funeral was at the time the most imposing ever seen in northern Wales.

References

Further reading
Ieuan Wyn Jones - Y Llinyn Arian (1998)

People from Denbigh
Welsh Protestant religious leaders
Welsh journalists
Welsh-speaking clergy
1815 births
1898 deaths
19th-century British journalists
British male journalists
19th-century British male writers
19th-century British writers